Cambria Township is a civil township of Hillsdale County in the U.S. state of Michigan.  The population was 2,229 at the 2020 census.

History
Cambria Township was established in 1841 and named after Cambria, New York, which was the hometown of many of the area's early settlers.

Communities
It was founded by Horace and George Banker, who settled here in 1838. The sawmill site, also known as Bankers Station, was the southern terminus of the Detroit, Hillsdale and Indiana Rail Road. It was platted in 1869. A post office operated from January 30, 1872 until January 31, 1909.
John McDermid, with his brother Andrew, established a sawmill here in June 1835 followed by a grist mill. The area was a part of Woodbridge Township until 1841 when it was set off as a separate township. A post office named Woodbridge had been established on December 14, 1840 and was renamed Cambria on June 1, 1841. A post office named Cambria Mills was established on April 17, 1848, and the name changed to Cambria on November 28, 1882. The office was closed on September 17, 1906. Cambria Mills was platted in 1878, but was never incorporated.
 Steamburg is a hamlet along Steamburg Road near East Bear Lake Road. The Bates-Fritze home near Steamburg was blown apart by the 1965 Palm Sunday tornado.

Geography

Major highways
 runs briefly through the northeast corner of the township.

Demographics
As of the census of 2000, there were 2,546 people, 986 households, and 725 families residing in the township. The racial makeup of the township was 97.05% White, 0.43% African American, 0.39% Native American, 0.59% Asian, 0.43% from other races, and 1.10% from two or more races. Hispanic or Latino of any race were 0.63% of the population.

There were 986 households, out of which 32.2% had children under the age of 18 living with them, 61.3% were married couples living together, 7.4% had a female householder with no husband present, and 26.4% were non-families. 21.4% of all households were made up of individuals, and 7.6% had someone living alone who was 65 years of age or older.  The average household size was 2.58 and the average family size was 2.97.

In the township the population was spread out, with 26.8% under the age of 18, 7.4% from 18 to 24, 27.7% from 25 to 44, 24.5% from 45 to 64, and 13.6% who were 65 years of age or older.  The median age was 38 years. For every 100 females, there were 107.0 males.  For every 100 females age 18 and over, there were 102.8 males.

The median income for a household in the township was $40,889, and the median income for a family was $46,650. Males had a median income of $38,031 versus $22,543 for females. The per capita income for the township was $20,109.  About 6.5% of families and 8.2% of the population were below the poverty line, including 5.0% of those under age 18 and 10.7% of those age 65 or over.

Education
The township is served by three separate public school districts.  The majority of the township is served by Hillsdale Community Schools.  The southwest portion of the township is served by Reading Community Schools, while a very small southeast portion is served by Camden-Frontier Schools.

Images

References

Townships in Michigan
Townships in Hillsdale County, Michigan
1841 establishments in Michigan
Populated places established in 1841